Jacob Baxter (June 6, 1832 – July 23, 1912) was speaker of the Legislature of Ontario in 1887-1890 and served as Liberal MLA for Haldimand from 1867 to 1898.

He was born in Bertie Township in Welland County, Upper Canada in 1832, the son of Jacob Baxter, former reeve of Bertie. He studied medicine, received the degree of M.D. from the University of New York and the Bellevue Hospital Medical College and set up a medical practice in Cayuga in partnership with his younger brother Benjamin. He also served as justice of the peace and as surgeon for the local militia unit - 37th Haldimand Rifles. In 1860, he married Rose Griffith. He was defeated by John Senn in the 1894 general election but Senn's election was appealed and Baxter won the subsequent by-election. After retiring from politics, Baxter served as registrar for Haldimand County. He is buried in the Riverside Cemetery, Cayuga, Ontario.

References

External links

1832 births
1912 deaths
Ontario Liberal Party MPPs
Speakers of the Legislative Assembly of Ontario
Canadian military doctors
Canadian justices of the peace
Physicians from Ontario